Oļegs Karavajevs (13 February 1961 – 6 October 2020) was a Latvian professional footballer who played as a goalkeeper. He was the goalkeeper who made the most appearances for Latvia national team during the 1990s.

Club career
Born in Barnaul, Karavajevs' first club was Alga Frunze in Kyrgyzstan (at that time still within the Soviet Union) with which Karavajevs played 18 matches in 1979. Karavajevs stayed with Frunze until 1984, except for a brief time with Pakhtakor Tashkent in 1981. Then came a season with Kairat Almaty but Karavajevs became a real Soviet First League goalkeeper in 1985 when he transferred to SKA Khabarovsk. With SKA he played 88 matches over two seasons and was invited to transfer to Daugava Rīga where he took over the number one goalkeeper position from Aleksandrs Kulakovs.

In 1987 Daugava with Karavajevs as an irreplaceable goalkeeper nearly earned promotion to the Soviet top league but in 1988 the performance of the club started to decline and Karavajevs had to battle for his position with Valeri Shantalosov.

In 1988 Karavajevs left Daugava for Fakel Voronezh. For two seasons he was the top goalkeeper of Fakel but then he went abroad and joined the Serbian club OFK Belgrade, playing back then in the Yugoslav First League. While playing in Yugoslavia, his name was spelled and referred to as Oleg Karavajev. He came to Belgrade in the summer of 1990 having played the second half of the 1990–91 season back with Fakel. The next summer he returned and stayed with OFK until the winter break of the 1992–93 season (already playing in the First League of FR Yugoslavia) when he returned to Latvia and played with Olimpija Rīga.

With his next move, Karavajevs, came to Cyprus where he played for Evagoras Paphos in 1993–94. From there his steps led to Carl Zeiss Jena and FSV Zwickau in Germany.

For the 1998 season Karavajevs went to Latvia as he joined the champion club Skonto FC where he played together with Aleksandrs Koliņko who eventually would replace Karavajevs as the main goalkeeper for the Latvia national team. In 1999 Karavajevs joined the newly founded FK Rīga with which he won the Latvian Cup and retired after the season.

International career
In total from 1992 to 1999 Karavajevs played 38 matches for the Latvia national team. He was never a 100% first goalkeeper for Latvia, as he had a very strong opponent in the person of Raimonds Laizāns who played for Skonto FC – the base club for the Latvia national team during the 1990s. Still Karavajevs played slightly more for Latvia – he beat Laizāns by seven matches but Karavajevs also usually played in the more important matches. Karavajevs played in several historic matches for Latvia – when it managed to hold draws against the Euro 1992 winners Denmark and one of the strongest European national teams Spain. He played his last two matches for Latvia in 1999 in two goalless draws against Greece and Albania.

Death
Karavajevs died on 6 October 2020 in Germany, aged 59.

References

1961 births
2020 deaths
People from Barnaul
Soviet footballers
Latvian footballers
Association football goalkeepers
Latvia international footballers
Yugoslav First League players
Cypriot First Division players
FC Alga Bishkek players
Pakhtakor Tashkent FK players
FC Kairat players
FC SKA-Khabarovsk players
Daugava Rīga players
FC Fakel Voronezh players
OFK Beograd players
AEP Paphos FC players
FC Carl Zeiss Jena players
FSV Zwickau players
Skonto FC players
FK Rīga players
Evagoras Paphos players
Soviet expatriate footballers
Soviet expatriate sportspeople in Yugoslavia
Expatriate footballers in Yugoslavia
Latvian expatriate sportspeople in Cyprus
Expatriate footballers in Cyprus
Latvian expatriate sportspeople in Germany
Expatriate footballers in Germany